Voskresenskoye is a rural locality (a selo) in Blagoveshchenskoye Rural Settlement, Velsky District, Arkhangelsk Oblast, Russia. The population was 302 as of 2014.

Geography 
Voskresenskoye is located 61 km north of Velsk (the district's administrative centre) by road. Zaruchevye is the nearest rural locality.

References 

Rural localities in Velsky District